The 1975 Israel Super Cup was the fifth Israel Super Cup (tenth, including unofficial matches, as the competition wasn't played within the Israel Football Association in its first 5 editions, until 1969), an annual Israel football match played between the winners of the previous season's Top Division and Israel State Cup. 

The match was played between Hapoel Be'er Sheva, champions of the 1974–75 Liga Leumit and Hapoel Kfar Saba, winners of the 1974–75 Israel State Cup.

For both teams, this was their first appearance in the competition. At the match, played at Vasermil Stadium, Hapoel Be'er Sheva won 2–1.

Match details

References

1975
Super Cup
Super Cup 1975
Super Cup 1975
Israel Super Cup matches